Thomas Dickinson Bradshaw (15 March 1879 – after 1913) was an English professional footballer. He played for several Football League clubs, but never spent more than two years at any of them.

Career
After starting out with Lostock Hall in the late 1890s, Hambleton-born Bradshaw signed for Preston North End in 1896, but did not make any League appearances for the Lilywhites. He joined their arch-rivals Blackpool shortly thereafter, and went on to make seventeen League appearances for the Seasiders, scoring five goals. Equally-short spells followed at Sunderland, Nottingham Forest, Leicester Fosse and New Brighton Tower. His journeyman career continued with Swindon Town and Reading, before a return to Preston North End in 1902. Still without a League appearance for the Deepdale club, he moved on to Wellingborough, Southport Central, Earlestown, Accrington Stanley, another spell with Leicester Fosse, Rossendale United and, finally, Glossop.

In 1913 he replaced Edgar Chadwick for one match as coach of the Netherlands national football team.

References

1879 births
1930 deaths
People from Hambleton, Lancashire
English footballers
Association football outside forwards
Preston North End F.C. players
Blackpool F.C. players
Sunderland A.F.C. players
Nottingham Forest F.C. players
Leicester City F.C. players
New Brighton Tower F.C. players
Swindon Town F.C. players
Reading F.C. players
Wellingborough Town F.C. players
Southport F.C. players
Earlestown F.C. players
Accrington Stanley F.C. (1891) players
Rossendale United F.C. players
Glossop North End A.F.C. players
English Football League players
Netherlands national football team managers
English expatriate football managers
English Football League representative players